Mario Teófilo Orta Olita (born July 27, 1967 in Montevideo, Uruguay) is a former Uruguayan footballer who played for clubs of Uruguay, Argentina, Chile, México and Costa Rica.

Teams
  Liverpool 1987
  Herediano 1987-1988
  Defensor Sporting Club 1989
  Morelia 1990-1991
  Deportivo Mandiyú 1991-1992
  Saprissa 1992-1994
  Sud América 1994-1996
  Rentistas 1996-1997
  Rangers 1997-1998
  C.A. Bella Vista 1998
  Deportivo Maldonado 1999
  Rentistas 1999-2001
  Liverpool 2002-2003

References
 Profile at BDFA 

1967 births
Living people
Uruguayan footballers
Uruguayan expatriate footballers
Liga MX players
Liverpool F.C. (Montevideo) players
Atlético Morelia players
C.A. Rentistas players
Deportivo Maldonado players
Rangers de Talca footballers
C.A. Bella Vista players
C.S. Herediano footballers
Deportivo Saprissa players
Deportivo Mandiyú footballers
Expatriate footballers in Chile
Expatriate footballers in Argentina
Expatriate footballers in Costa Rica
Expatriate footballers in Mexico
Association football forwards